Bottle Rocket a 1997 soundtrack to the Wes Anderson film of the same name. The film's score was composed by Mark Mothersbaugh.

Three songs from the film, "2000 Man" by The Rolling Stones, "7 and 7 Is" and "Alone Again Or" by Love, were not included.

Track listing 
"Voluntary Hospital Escape" – Mark Mothersbaugh
"Gun Buyers" – Mark Mothersbaugh
"Bookstore Robbery" – Mark Mothersbaugh
"Dignan's Dance" – Mark Mothersbaugh
"And Also Because He Fired Me" – Mark Mothersbaugh
"Zorro Is Back" – Oliver Onions
"Cleaning Rooms With Inez" – Mark Mothersbaugh
"She Looks Just Like You" – Mark Mothersbaugh
"Pachanga Diferente" – René Touzet
"No Lifeguard on Duty" – Mark Mothersbaugh
"Mambo Guajiro" – René Touzet
"Rocky" – Mark Mothersbaugh
"Doesn't Sound That Bad in Spanish" – Mark Mothersbaugh
"Over and Done With" – The Proclaimers
"Snowflake Music/Mr. Henry's Chop Shop" – Mark Mothersbaugh
"You're Breaking His Heart" – Mark Mothersbaugh
"Goddammit I'm In" – Mark Mothersbaugh
"No Jazz" – Mark Mothersbaugh
"Highway" – Mark Mothersbaugh
"75 Year Plan" – Mark Mothersbaugh
"Futureman's Theme" – Mark Mothersbaugh

1997 soundtrack albums
Comedy film soundtracks